The canton of Grands Lacs is an administrative division of the Landes department, southwestern France. It was created at the French canton reorganisation which came into effect in March 2015. Its seat is in Parentis-en-Born.

It consists of the following communes:
 
Belhade
Biscarrosse
Gastes
Liposthey
Lüe
Mano
Moustey
Parentis-en-Born
Pissos
Sainte-Eulalie-en-Born
Sanguinet
Saugnacq-et-Muret
Ychoux

Councillors

Pictures of the canton

References

Cantons of Landes (department)